SMS Sachsen was the third of four dreadnought-type s built, but never finished, for the German Kaiserliche Marine (Imperial Navy) in the 1910s. This ship is sometimes considered to be part of a sub-class with her sister . Like the other members of the class, she was to be armed with the same main battery of eight  guns in four gun turrets, but she differed from the other members of her class in her propulsion system. She exchanged the steam turbine on her center propeller shaft in favor of a diesel engine. She was laid down in April 1914 at the Germaniawerft shipyard, but the start of World War I in July slowed work on the ship; she was launched in November 1916, but as resources were diverted to more pressing projects, including U-boat construction, work stopped completely when the ship was about nine months from completion. Some components of her propulsion system were reused in several of the Type U 151 submarines. The Treaty of Versailles that ended the war in June 1919 specified that all warships under construction in Germany were to be destroyed, and Sachsen was accordingly sold for scrap in 1920 and dismantled the following year.

Development

Design work on the  began in 1910 in the context of the Anglo-German naval arms race, with initial discussions focused on the caliber of the main battery; previous German battleships had carried  guns, but as foreign navies adopted  and  weapons, the German naval command felt the need to respond with larger guns of their own. Admiral Alfred von Tirpitz, the State Secretary of the Reichsmarineamt (RMA—Imperial Naval Office), was able to use public outcry over the Agadir Crisis to pressure the Reichstag (Imperial Diet) into appropriating additional funds for the Kaiserliche Marine (Imperial Navy) to offset the additional cost of the larger weapons. The design staff settled on the 38 cm caliber since the 40 cm was significantly more expensive and the 38 cm gun marked a significant improvement over existing German guns.

As the German Navy began preparations to begin construction for the battleship of fiscal year 1914, designated "Ersatz Kaiser Friedrich III" in 1912 as a replacement for the elderly pre-dreadnought battleship , the design staff became aware that the latest British battleships—the —would have a high top speed. The Germans opted to make another attempt to incorporate a diesel engine to power the new ship's center propeller shaft (they had previously sought to install them on the earlier  but they were not ready in time). This had the benefit of refining the hull lines and thereby improving its hydrodynamic shape, increasing her speed. Because of these changes, some historians, including the German naval historian Dirk Nottellmann, consider Sachsen and the fourth Bayern-class battleship, to constitute a sub-class of the basic Bayern design.

Description

Unlike her three sister ships, which were powered by three sets of Schichau steam turbines, Sachsen received only two sets of turbines on the outboard shafts, with steam provided by six coal-fired water-tube boilers and three oil-fired models. Upon commissioning, she would have carried a crew of 42 officers and 1,129 enlisted men.

Had she been completed, she would have been armed with eight  SK L/45 guns.. These would have been arranged in four twin-gun turrets: two superfiring turret pairs fore and aft of the superstructure. Her secondary armament was to have consisted of sixteen  guns and four  guns. She would also have been fitted with five  torpedo tubes submerged in her hull, one in the bow and two on each broadside.

Construction and cancellation

Sachsen was ordered under the fourth and final Naval Law, which was passed in 1912. Kaiser Wilhelm II approved the design, which had already been ordered from the Germaniawerft shipyard in Kiel; the Reichstag had not officially approved the budget, making the beginning of construction a matter of risk for the shipyard. Funding for the vessel was duly authorized, and on 21 February 1914, the battleship  was launched, which cleared the slipway that had been reserved to build Ersatz Kaiser Friedrich III. Preparatory work began immediately after Kronprinz vacated the slipway and on 21 March, Wilhelm II signed the final order to build the new ship. Her keel laying took place on 15 April, and she was assigned the construction number 210. Initial work proceeded slowly, owing to the start of World War I in July, as resources were diverted to complete fitting-out work on Kronprinz as well as several torpedo boats and U-boats under construction at the yard. Her completed hull was scheduled to be launched in early 1916, but the delays pushed her launching to 21 November. Her completion had been planned for early 1917, but increased shortages of material and labor, particularly as these resources began to be diverted to supporting the U-boat campaign against Britain, further slowed work, which eventually ground to a halt.

After Germany resumed and greatly expanded the unrestricted submarine warfare campaign in February 1917, Admiral Eduard von Capelle, who had by then replaced Tirpitz as the head of the RMA, argued that capital ship construction should be halted in favor of U-boat construction. As a result, work stopped on Sachsen altogether, when she was about nine months from completion. Components that had been assembled for her diesel generators were reused on the merchant submarine . The diesel engine was divided into propulsion systems for four of the Type U 151 submarines in early 1917. By the time work stopped in 1917, Sachsen had received six of her eight main guns, and the remaining pair had been diverted to be converted into railway guns or fixed batteries in Flanders. Approximately 76 percent of the hull had been assembled and 13 percent of her armor had been fitted, with much of the rest in the workshop alongside, being prepared to be installed. The ship was complete up to the battery deck—one deck below the main deck—and 50 percent of her upper deck was in place. Her boilers had been installed and both of her turbines and the diesel engine had been almost completely assembled in the workshop, requiring trials before they could be fitted. Both of her funnels had been erected.

The ship laid unfinished in Kiel at the end of the war. According to Article 186 of the Treaty of Versailles, signed in June 1919, all German surface warships under construction were to be immediately broken up for scrap. At the same time, her guns were removed and she was moved to the Kieler Förde later that year to await the breakers' yard. Sachsen was duly stricken from the naval register on 3 November 1919 and sold in late 1920 to ship breakers. After being sold, she was returned to the shipyard to have her side armor and gun turrets removed. She was then transferred to the breakers to be dismantled, work lasting until 1923.

Notes

Footnotes

Citations

References

Further reading
 
 

Bayern-class battleships
World War I battleships of Germany
1916 ships
Ships built in Kiel